The extreme points of Malaysia include the coordinates that are further north, south, east or west than any other location in Malaysia; and the highest and the lowest altitudes in the country.

The latitude and longitude are expressed in decimal degree notation, in which a positive latitude value refers to the northern hemisphere, and a negative value refers to the southern hemisphere. Similarly, a positive longitude value refers to the eastern hemisphere, and a negative value refers to the western hemisphere. The coordinates used in this article are sourced from Google Earth, which makes use of the WGS84 geodetic reference system. Additionally, a negative altitude value refers to land below sea level.

Extreme points

Overall

Peninsular Malaysia
The following are the extreme physical land mass points on the Malaysian peninsula inclusive of islands.

East Malaysia
The following are the extreme physical land mass points in East Malaysia inclusive of islands.

Extreme altitudes

Notes
Coordinates obtained from Google Earth. Google Earth makes use of the WGS84 geodetic reference system.

References

See also
 Geography of Malaysia
 Extreme points of Asia

Geography of Malaysia
Lists of coordinates
Malaysia